Cycnidolon is a genus of beetles in the family Cerambycidae, containing the following species:

 Cycnidolon apicale Martins & Galileo, 2007
 Cycnidolon approximatum (White, 1855)
 Cycnidolon batesianum (White, 1855)
 Cycnidolon bimaculatum Martins, 1960
 Cycnidolon binodosum Bates, 1870
 Cycnidolon bruchi Napp & Martins, 1985
 Cycnidolon caracense Martins, 1964
 Cycnidolon clarkei Martins & Galileo, 2007
 Cycnidolon eques Thomson, 1864
 Cycnidolon gounellei Bruch, 1908
 Cycnidolon immaculatum Galileo & Martins, 2004
 Cycnidolon minutum Martins, 1960
 Cycnidolon obliquum Martins, 1969
 Cycnidolon phormesioides Martins, 1960
 Cycnidolon podicale (Thomson, 1867)
 Cycnidolon pulchellum (Lameere, 1893)
 Cycnidolon pumillum Napp & Martins, 1985
 Cycnidolon sericeum Martins, 1960
 Cycnidolon spinosum Napp & Martins, 1985
 Cycnidolon trituberculatum Martins, 1969

References

 
Neoibidionini